The A540 is a non-primary road that runs from Chester, Cheshire to Hoylake, Wirral. It is the only road in the series A54X that is entirely within England, with the exception of a short stretch of the A548. It provides links to Manchester and North Wales, via the A494 and the M56. It bypasses the town of Neston and is in the heart of Heswall, Hoylake and West Kirby. A small stretch of the road, shared with the A5116, is a primary road.

Roads in England
Roads in Cheshire